The Shamlu tribe, also known as the Shamli tribe, was one of the seven original and the most powerful Qizilbash tribes of Turcoman origin in Iran.

List of the Khans of Shamlu
Ahmad Sultan  Shamlu
Abdu Beg Shamlu ( Father in law of Ismail I )
Husein Khan Shamlu ( The most powerful qizilbash Khan, executed by Shah Tahmasp in 1534)
Hossein Khan Shamlu ( Governor of Lors Pushtkuh- Province of Lorestan )
Hasan Khan Shamlu
Mirza Vali Khan Shamlu (Governor)
Ali Gholi Khan Shamlu (aka Haji Ali Qizilbash Mazandarani Governor of Khorassan in 1576 and chief of the armies under Shah Abbas I en 1588 )
JĀNI BEG KHAN BIGDELI SHĀMLU(d. 1645), ishik-āqāsi-bāshi (master of ceremony) and qurchi-bāshi (head of the tribal guards) under the Safavid Shah Ṣafi I (r. 1629-42) and Shah ʿAbbās II (r. 1642-66).
Sinan Khan Shamlu (Ambassador of Shah AbbasI to Emperor Rudolph II of Habsburg)
Muhamad Gholi Khan Bigdili-e Shamlu
Dormish Khan Shamlu (Brother in law of Shah Ismail I and Governor of Isfahan )
Murteza Gulu Khan Shamlu-Ardabili (invented a style of calligraphy called "Shikasta Nastaʿlīq")
Abbas Gholi Khan Shamlu-Shahsevan (Governor of Herat, 1812)
Mu'min Khan Shamlu (1699–1707, Grand Vizier )
Mohammed Zaman Khan Shamlu (1711)
Muhamad Ali Khan Bigdili-e Shamlu (c.1722, Grand Vizier )
Zaynal Khan Shamlu
Murshid Gholi Khan Ustajlu-e Shamlu
Heydar Gholi Khan Ghiaï-e Chamlou I
Mirza Ali Akbar Khan Ghiaï-e Chamlou
Manouchehr Ghiaie-e Shamloo  (Governor of Tehran)
Heydar Gholi Khan Ghiaï-e Chamlou II (Architect and Aide de Camp of the Impériale Court of Iran under Emperor Mohammad Reza Pahlavi)
Farhad Khan Ghiaï-e Chamlou( 1957 )

Bibliography
Yves Bomati and Houchang Nahavandi,Shah Abbas, Emperor of Persia,1587-1629, 2017, ed. Ketab Corporation, Los Angeles, English translation by Azizeh Azodi.
Roman Ghirshman, Persia El reino immortal, Londres, 1971, p. 141
J.P. Roux, " Histoire des Turcs", Paris, 1984, pp. 253–54
David Morgan. "Shah Isma'il and the Establishment of Shi'ism"chpt. 12 of his Medieval Persia: 1040-1797, Longman, New York, 1988, pp. 112–123.

See also
Qizilbash
Safavid dynasty
Farhad Khan Ghiaï-e Chamlou (in French)
Ahmad Shamlou

References

External links

History of the Khans of Ghiaī-e Chamlou

 
Ethnic Turkmen people
History of Turkey
History of ethnic groups in Iran